The Discovery 7.9 is a Canadian sailboat, that was designed by Alex McGruer and first built in 1975.

The Discovery 7.9 is a development of the Grampian 26.

Production
The boat was built by Grampian Marine in Canada between 1975 and 1977, but it is now out of production. Only a small number were completed.

After Grampian's end of production the molds were acquired by a new company who built a small number of boats with different window arrangements.

Design

The Discovery 7.9 is a small recreational keelboat, built predominantly of fiberglass, with wood trim. It has a masthead sloop rig, a raked stem, a vertical transom, a transom-hung rudder and a fixed fin keel. It displaces  and carries  of ballast.

See also
List of sailing boat types

Related development
Grampian 26

Similar sailboats
Beneteau First 26
Beneteau First 265
C&C 26
C&C 26 Wave
Contessa 26
Dawson 26
Grampian 26
Herreshoff H-26
Hunter 26
Hunter 26.5
Hunter 260
Hunter 270
MacGregor 26
Mirage 26
Nash 26
Nonsuch 26
Outlaw 26
Paceship PY 26
Parker Dawson 26
Pearson 26
Sandstream 26
Tanzer 26
Yamaha 26

References

External links

Keelboats
1970s sailboat type designs
Sailing yachts
Sailboat type designs by Alex McGruer
Sailboat types built by Grampian Marine